Victor Kanevsky may refer to:

 Viktor Kanevskyi (1936–2018), retired Ukrainian and Soviet football player and coach
 Victor Kanevsky (dancer) (born 1963), ballroom dancer, coach, and choreographer